Félix De Vigne (16 March 1806 – 5 December 1862) was a Belgian painter.
He was a history painter, engraver, art historian, and instructor at the Royal Academy of Fine Arts in Ghent, Belgium, the city of his birth. In 1847, he published , an illustrated compendium of the flags, shields and costumes of medieval guilds and military groups.

Personal life
De Vigne was born in Ghent on 16 March 1806, the eldest of six children. His brother was sculptor Pieter De Vigne (1812–1877). He was the father of Brussels architect Edmond De Vigne (1841–1918), and the stepfather of painter Jules Breton.

De Vigne taught his niece, Emma De Vigne, paint.

Sources 
This page translated from its Dutch equivalent accessed 9/13/2010

References

External links 

1806 births
1862 deaths
19th-century Belgian painters
19th-century Belgian male artists
Academic staff of the Royal Academy of Fine Arts (Ghent)